Eupithecia andrasi is a moth in the family Geometridae. It is found in north-western China (Shaanxi).

The wingspan is about 18 mm. The fore- and hindwings are pale buff.

References

Moths described in 2004
andrasi
Moths of Asia